Zamia stricta is a species of cycad in the family Zamiaceae. It is endemic to Cuba.

References

Whitelock, Loran M. 2002. The Cycads. Portland: Timber Press.

External links
 

stricta
Taxa named by Friedrich Anton Wilhelm Miquel